"Bodies" is a song by English recording artist Robbie Williams. It was released on 12 October 2009 by EMI as the lead single from his eighth studio album Reality Killed the Video Star (2009). It received its premiere on The Chris Moyles Show on BBC Radio 1 after an interview with Williams on 4 September 2009 at 8am. It is Williams' first single release as a solo artist since "She's Madonna" in March 2007.

Producer Trevor Horn told Simon Mayo (who filled in for Chris Evans for an episode of his BBC radio show in October 2009) that the song’s trademark swooping bass riff was inspired by the song “Stay Where You Are”, which appeared on the album Faded Seaside Glamour by British indie band Delays.

"Bodies" entered and peaked at number two on the UK Singles Chart, selling 89,000 copies in its first week and attaining his best first-week sales since "Rock DJ" in August 2000. Williams was beaten to number 1 by Alexandra Burke, whose single "Bad Boys" (featuring rapper Flo Rida) was released on the same day and sold 187,000 in the same week. The cover art was photographed by Julian Broad.

Track listing
International CD single
 "Bodies" – 4:04
 "Bodies" (Body Double Remix) – 6:14

Digital EP
 "Bodies" – 4:04
 "Bodies" (Body Double Remix) – 6:14
 "Bodies" (Fred Falke Remix) – 6:53
 "Bodies" (Cahill Refix Edit) – 3:50

Lyrics
The song's cryptic lyrics, with a wide variety of religious references included, have been subject to a lot of speculation. In an October 2010 interview with Q magazine, Williams referred to the lyrics as "fucking gibberish" that he considered pointless. He also stated that "Who knows what I was going on about? I was fucking stoned."

Music video
The music video for "Bodies" was filmed in the Mojave Desert, directed by Williams' frequent collaborator Vaughan Arnell and features Williams' then girlfriend, and eventual wife (married 2010), Ayda Field. It had its official premiere on 9 September 2009.

Critical reception
Popjustice called the song "[It's] a confident, dignified comeback single with a big chorus" commenting that the song is "better than: 'Let Me Entertain You' , as good as: 'Rock DJ', not as good as: 'Feel'." and adding that: "'Bodies' is not a comeback single that takes many chances – it is, career wise, Robbie's most important single since 'Angels' and there's obviously a certain amount of brand rebuilding needed. But nor is it a comeback single that attempts to pretend the last three years haven't happened. [...] 'Bodies' sounds like Robbie and Trevor Horn bringing out the best in each other – in this case 'the best' equalling a big comeback single from Britain's best male popstar."

Digital Spy gave the single four stars (out of five) and said that: "With an Ian Brown-esque funky strut, some monkish chanting and plenty of electro squelches, he hasn't completely ditched the not-so-successful experimentation of his last LP, but this time around he counterbalances it with a whopping great chorus that will have even Gary Barlow green with envy. [...] Packed full of his usual raised eyebrow cheekiness and with a barmy-but-bloody-massive bridge, we're still not entirely sure what the Robster's actually singing about. However, by the time he's launched into the choir-backed crescendo, on which he hollers like a hyperactive preacher, we're too sold to care. Welcome back Robbie – and don't leave it so long next time."

At a Southend gig in September 2012, Robbie commented that "Bodies" and "Rudebox" were both "lame songs" and that he had "let himself down". However, after fans spoke up against his claims via YouTube comments, he added the song to the setlist for his stadium tour for the following album.

Charts

Weekly charts

Year-end charts

Certifications and sales

Release history

References

External links
 RobbieWilliams.com – Robbie Williams official website

2009 singles
Dutch Top 40 number-one singles
European Hot 100 Singles number-one singles
Number-one singles in Austria
Number-one singles in Germany
Number-one singles in Hungary
Number-one singles in Italy
Number-one singles in Switzerland
Robbie Williams songs
Song recordings produced by Trevor Horn
Songs written by Robbie Williams
Music videos directed by Vaughan Arnell
2009 songs
EMI Records singles